The Southeastern Conference baseball tournament (sometimes known simply as the SEC Tournament) is the conference tournament in baseball for the Southeastern Conference (SEC). It is a partially double-elimination tournament and seeding is based on regular season conference records. The winner receives the conference's automatic bid to the NCAA Division I baseball tournament.  The SEC Tournament champion is separate from the conference champion.  The conference championship is determined solely by regular season record.

Tournament
The SEC Baseball tournament is a double-elimination tournament held each year at Regions Park in Hoover, Alabama.  Twelve of the 14 SEC teams qualify for the tournament.  The winner earns the SEC's guaranteed bid to the NCAA Tournament.  Most of the other teams who qualify for the SEC tournament more often than not earn at-large bids to the NCAA field of 64 teams, due to the reputation of the SEC as one of the nation's elite baseball conferences. With the expansion of the NCAA baseball field from 48 to 64 teams in 1999, some teams which have not made the SEC tournament have still qualified for the NCAA tournament.

History

Pre-Tournament
Teams were split into divisions from 1951 through 1985. Each team played the other four division opponents in home-and-home three-game series. Interdivisional games were common, but did not count in the conference standings.

From 1951-1976, the division winners played a best-of-3 series to determine the SEC champion and representative to the NCAA tournament.

1977–1986
From 1977–1986, the tournament consisted of four (out of 10) teams competing in a double elimination bracket. The top two teams in each division qualified, and the winner was declared the overall champion.

From 1977-1985, the tournament site alternated between winners of the West (odd-numbered years) and East (even-numbered years) divisions. During these seasons, Florida hosted the tournament in every even-numbered year, and Mississippi State hosted in every odd-numbered year except 1985, when LSU supplanted the Bulldogs atop the West.

In 1986, the SEC eliminated division play, adopting a full round-robin schedule (27 games), and the team with the best regular season conference record (LSU) earned the right to host.

1987–1991
In 1987, the tournament expanded to 6 teams (out of 10), while remaining a double-elimination tournament.  Beginning with the 1988 season, the winner was no longer considered the conference's overall champion, although the winner continued to receive the conference's automatic bid to the NCAA tournament.

In 1990, the conference did not accept an automatic bid after lightning and heavy rain disrupted the tournament's championship game and co-champions were declared. The teams in the cancelled championship game, LSU and Mississippi State, had already received bids to the NCAA tournament by being selected as regional hosts before the SEC Tournament. LSU led 6–0 in the third inning at the time of cancellation.

Games on the last two days of the 1991 tournament were shortened to seven innings due to torrential rain in Baton Rouge which left standing water throughout the outfield at LSU's Alex Box Stadium.

1992
With the addition of Arkansas and South Carolina to the conference, the SEC held an eight team (out of 12) double elimination tournament. The top four teams in each division qualified. The tournament followed a format that included reseeding the teams once only four were still active in the tournament.

1993–1995
The SEC held separate tournaments for the Eastern and Western divisions in 1993, 1994 and 1995. The tournament games counted in the league standings, and the team with the best winning percentage at the end of each tournament, covering 24 regular season SEC games plus tournament games, was crowned league champion.  Each division tournament consisted of all six teams in that division. The SEC devised the plan in the hopes of garnering two automatic berths to the NCAA tournament for each of the tournament champions; however, the NCAA rejected the SEC plan, instead awarding one automatic bid to the division tournament champion with the highest overall winning percentage.

1996–1997
For two years, eight teams qualified for the league tournament; however, the teams seeded fifth through eighth were forced into a single-elimination play-in round. The two winners of the play-in games advanced to the main bracket, which was a six-team, double-elimination format, same as the NCAA regional format used from 1987-1998.

1998–2007
Starting in 1998, the SEC adopted the "Omaha" bracket, splitting the eight qualifying teams into two four-team double elimination brackets. The division winners are seeded 1 and 2, while the remaining six teams are seeded 3 through 8. Seeds 2, 3, 6 and 7 form bracket one, while seeds 1, 4, 5 and 8 are in bracket two. The two bracket winners met in a winner-take-all championship game. This was the format used in the College World Series from 1988 through 2002, prior to the NCAA instituting a best-of-3 championship series in 2003.

In 1998, the top three teams in each division plus two "wild card" teams qualified for the tournament. In 1999, the qualification standards were changed to the top two teams in each division plus the next four based upon overall conference winning percentage, which remained in place through 2011.

Since 1996, SEC teams have played 30 conference games (10 three-game series). From 1996 through 2012, each team played all five of its division opponents and five of six opponents from the opposite division. With the addition of Missouri and Texas A&M to the SEC for the 2013 season, teams now play all six division opponents and four of seven from the opposite division.

During this period, the popularity of the event rose significantly.  There was speculation the Tournament could move to other larger Southern cities, including Atlanta's Turner Field, but additional RV accommodations secured the event in Hoover.

2008–2011
In 2008, the SEC adopted a "flipped bracket" on a trial basis. The tournament still consisted of eight teams in a double elimination bracket. However, after two days of play the undefeated team from each bracket would move into the other bracket. This reduced the number of rematches teams would have to play in order to win the tournament. A similar format is used at the Women's College World Series, although the team which wins its second game after losing its first switches brackets instead of the 2–0 team.

2012
With the addition of Texas A&M and Missouri for 2013, and the lack of any "bubble" in recent years to the tournament (in some years, all eight teams in the tournament and a team or two that does not make the tournament would qualify for the NCAA Regionals), the SEC expanded the tournament from 8 to 10 teams. The tournament began on Tuesday and concluded on Sunday. In 2012, the SEC also began a Baseball Legends Program, which will honor four former SEC baseball standouts, with schools rotating each season.

Both finalists in the 2012 tournament, Mississippi State and Vanderbilt, had to play in the opening round. Since then, no team playing the opening Tuesday has advanced to the championship game.

2013–present
The 2013 format saw another expansion by two teams, bringing the total number of participants to 12.  Seeds five through twelve play a single-elimination opening round, followed by the traditional double-elimination format until the semifinals, when the format reverts to single-elimination.

In 2016, the SEC considered bids from Nashville and New Orleans to move to Triple-A facilities in those cities. Instead, the conference extended its contract with Hoover through 2021.

SEC Championship Series Winners (1948–1976)

By School
Updated as of 2018 season

SEC Tournament Champions (1977–present)

Mississippi State and LSU were declared co-champions in 1990 when the tournament was abandoned because of weather issues.

By School
Updated as of 2022 tournament

Mississippi State and LSU were declared co-champions in 1990 when the tournament was abandoned because of weather issues.

The SEC held separate tournaments for the Eastern and Western divisions in 1993, 1994 and 1995. The tournament games counted in the conference standings, and the team with the best winning percentage at the end of each tournament was crowned conference champion.

The 1992 season was the first in SEC play for Arkansas and South Carolina.

The 2013 season was the first in SEC play for Missouri and Texas A&M

External links
ESPNcdn.com 2019 SEC Baseball Record Book
SECSports.com Miscellaneous SEC Baseball Tournament Information
SECSports.com All-Time SEC Baseball Tournament Results
SECSports.com SEC Baseball Tournament Records
SECSports.com SEC Baseball Tournament All-Tournament Teams
2015 SEC Baseball Tournament Attendance @ SECSports.com

References